Krasnapolle District (Krasnopolsky raion) is a raion (district) in Mogilev Region, Belarus, the administrative center is the urban-type settlement of Krasnapolle. As of 2009, its population was 11,176. Population of Krasnapolle accounts for 54.8% of the district's population.

Notable residents 
Viera Cierliukievič (1941 – 2000), political and trade union activist

Andrej Mryj (1893 – 1943), satirical writer, journalist, translator and a victim of Stalin's purges.

References

 
Districts of Mogilev Region